Justice Michael Bryan Joshua Lee (born 1965) is a Judge of the Federal Court of Australia located in the Sydney Registry. He is a National Coordinating Judge in both the Commercial and Corporations National Practice Area and the Defamation sub-area in the Other Federal Jurisdiction National Practice Area.

Education 
Lee was born in Perth in 1965 but was raised in Sydney where he attended Marist Brothers High School Eastwood.  Lee graduated in law from the University of Sydney.

Career 
Lee commenced work as a solicitor in 1989 with Corrs Chambers Westgarth. He went to the New South Wales Bar in 2002 and took silk in 2011. He was counsel for the John Marsden Australian defamation case, and the Australian political assassination case of Phuong Ngo.

He was appointed to the Federal Court in 2017 and is also an Additional Judge of the Supreme Court of the Australian Capital Territory.

He is the section editor for the Australian Law Journal section on class actions and is a Fellow of the University of Melbourne.

Publications and seminars 
 Varying Funding Agreements and Freedom of Contract: Some Observations by The Hon Justice Lee (IMF Bentham Class Actions Research Initiative with UNSW Law: Resolving Class Actions Effectively and Fairly), 1 June 2017
 Certification of Class Actions: A 'Solution' in Search of a Problem? by The Hon Justice Lee (A paper presented to the Commercial Law Association Seminar "Class Actions – Different Perspectives"), 20 October 2017
 Case Management & Insolvency: Matching Rhetoric & Reality, by The Hon Justice Lee (Key Note Speech at the Association of Independent Insolvency Practitioners Annual Conference), 28 June 2019
 Public Confidence, Apprehended Bias, and the Modern Federal Judiciary (AAL/ALRC Seminar), Judicial Impartiality eNews, February 2021
 Washington Diaries of Owen Dixon: Review by Justice Lee, Southern Highlands Newsletter #241, March 2021

See also 
 Judges of the Federal Court of Australia
 Swearing-in Ceremony for the Hon Justice Michael Lee, NSW Bar Association, 20/04/2017
 Silks appointed as new Federal Court of Australia judges, Australasian Lawyer, 28 Mar 2017
 Two new Judges appointed to Federal Court, Lawyers Weekly 30 March 2017

References

External links 
 Commercial and Corporations National Practice Area
 Other Federal Jurisdiction National Practice Area

21st-century Australian lawyers
Judges of the Federal Court of Australia
Living people
21st-century Australian judges
Lawyers from Perth, Western Australia
Lawyers from Sydney
1965 births
20th-century Australian lawyers
University of Sydney alumni